Warkatne is a village in the Karmala taluka of Solapur district in Maharashtra state, India.

Demographics
Covering  and comprising 330 households at the time of the 2011 census of India, Warkatne had a population of 1702. There were 912 males and 790 females, with 192 people being aged six or younger.

References

Villages in Karmala taluka